Thomas Hawkins Hanson, Sr. (1750–1812) was a planter from Maryland. He was born in Maryland to Samuel and Anne Hanson. Hanson served as a captain in the Continental Army during the American Revolutionary War. He married a widow, Rebecca (Dulaney) Addison, and the couple lived at Oxon Hill Manor in Prince George's County, Maryland. Their son, Thomas Hawkins Hanson, Jr., was born in Annapolis, Maryland on March 4, 1792.

Hanson was a nephew of John Hanson, a Maryland planter and public official who served as President of the Continental Congress. John Hanson died at Oxon Hill Manor during a visit there.

References

1750 births
1812 deaths
Continental Army officers from Maryland